The Sutersville Bridge is a structure that crosses the Youghiogheny River
between Sutersville and Elizabeth Township, Pennsylvania. It connects a rural southeastern corner of Allegheny County with a small Westmoreland County town.

Previously, a 1902 truss bridge stood on the site. It was replaced by the current bridge in 1986, as part of a major rehabilitation project along Western Pennsylvania's rivers; it shares its construction style with a variety of other bridges assembled during the same era. The Youghiogheny River Trail features a parking facility adjacent to the bridge's western approach.

References
PGH Bridges
National Bridges

Bridges in Allegheny County, Pennsylvania
Bridges completed in 1986
Road bridges in Pennsylvania
Bridges over the Youghiogheny River
Girder bridges in the United States